Clinton Levi Merriam (March 25, 1824 – February 18, 1900) was a United States representative from New York.

Merriam was born in Leyden, Lewis County, New York on March 25, 1824. He attended the common schools and Copenhagen Academy, Copenhagen, New York; engaged in mercantile pursuits in Utica, New York; moved to New York City in 1847 and became an importer; engaged in banking in 1860; returned to Leyden in 1864; elected as a Republican to the Forty-second and Forty-third Congresses (March 4, 1871 – March 3, 1875); retired from active business pursuits and lived in retirement at his house, "Homewood", on the family estate, "Locust Grove" near Leyden, New York. He died while on a visit in Washington, D.C., on February 18, 1900; interment in Leyden Hill Cemetery, Port Leyden, New York.

His children include  the zoologist Clinton Hart Merriam and the ornithologist Florence Augusta Merriam Bailey.

References

External links
 
 Clinton Levi Merriam Papers, circa 1848-1899 from the Smithsonian Institution Archives

1824 births
1900 deaths
Republican Party members of the United States House of Representatives from New York (state)
19th-century American politicians